The Keras Kardiotissas Monastery or  simply Keras Monastery is an  Eastern Orthodox monastery dedicated to Virgin Mary that is situated near the village of Kera of the Heraklion regional unit in Crete, Greece. It is built on the north slopes of Mt. Dikti,  at an altitude of 650 m and a location that is approximately 50 km east of Heraklion, next to the road to Lasithi Plateau.

History
The exact date of the monastery's establishment is unknown. However, references to it are made in manuscripts dating from the early fourteenth century. The monastery was named after an old icon of Theotokos that according to tradition was miraculous. That icon was transferred to Rome by a wine merchant in 1498, where it is now permanently enshrined in the  Church of St. Alphonsus near the  Esquiline Hill. The stolen icon was replaced by another one in 1735 that is also regarded as miraculous.
During the Ottoman occupation of Crete, the monastery often served as a local revolutionary center and suffered several retaliatory attacks as a result. In 1720, Kera monastery became Stauropegic (independent of the local Bishop).

Architecture
The monastery is surrounded by fortified walls. The main church (katholikon) was originally built as an arch-covered single space structure and was later expanded with two narthexes and a smaller chapel. The church features  murals dating to the 14th and 15th centuries.

Current status
Today, the monastery functions as a nunnery. It celebrates the birth of Mary on September 8th every year.

References

Buildings and structures in Heraklion (regional unit)
Monasteries in Crete
Christian monasteries established in the 14th century
Greek Orthodox monasteries in Greece